Boneh-ye Karim (also Romanized as Boneh-ye Karīm; also known as Boneh-ye Karīmī and Karīmī) is a village in Howmeh-ye Gharbi Rural District, in the Central District of Ramhormoz County, Khuzestan Province, Iran. At the 2006 census, its population was 279, in 61 families.

References 

Populated places in Ramhormoz County